Marshal is the highest rank in both the Brazilian Army and the Brazilian Air Force, although the latter is titled .  These ranks are equivalent to that of admiral in the navy. A marshal is distinguished by using five stars, which for a marshal of the air are in the approximate position of Southern Cross and for a marshal in the army, in the form of "X". The five stars of admiral are in the shape of a pentagon.

History
Until the structural reform of 1967 in the Brazilian Army, army generals (bearing four stars), when moving to the reserve, were awarded the fifth star automatically. With the reform, it was established that there would be only the promotion of a general to marshal in the event of war, thus extinguishing the rank of marshal within the army in times of peace. Those dubbed as marshals prior to such reform, however, would still bear such titles for the remainder of their lives. The last living Brazilian Army marshal, Marshal Waldemar Levy Cardoso, died in May 2009.

During the days of the Imperial Period (between 1822 and 1889), the patent, regarding the Army, was named "marshal of the army", having been renamed to its shorter current counterpart with the advent of the Republic after 1889.

Although a large number of marshals existed within Brazilian ranks in the second half of the 20th century as mentioned above, the last active marshal in the Brazilian Army (i.e., that to hold office in the command of active troops) was Marshal Mascarenhas de Morais, holding the position of commander of the Brazilian Expeditionary Force, a special corps assembled to fight alongside the Allied forces in the Mediterranean theatre of World War II. Marshal Mascarenhas de Morais would bear said position and title for the remainder of his life (thus, until 1968, when he died) as a result of a decree by the National Congress which dubbed the position and title honorary lifetime in the form of active troops.

Some marshals became President of Brazil, notably in the years following the establishment of the Republic in 1889 and also between the 1964 Brazilian coup d'état and the re-establishment of democracy in 1984/1985. Worthy mentions would be Marshal Deodoro da Fonseca and Floriano Peixoto (for the earlier aforementioned period) and Marshals Humberto de Alencar Castelo Branco and Artur da Costa e Silva (for the latter).

List of Brazilian marshals
This category comprises articles about marshal of the armed forces of Brazil (patent virtually extinct in 1967 when, from then, can only be attributed to 4-star generals -  -  who had participated actively during wartime). There have been 66 marshals; 63 in the Army and 3 in the Air Force

Marshals of the Empire of Brazil
During the monarchic regime, there were four general ranks (from lowest to highest): Brigadier, field marshal, lieutenant-general and marshal of the army. Although almost all international conflicts that Brazil participated occurred during the Imperial Era (Brazilian War of Independence (1822–25), Cisplatine War (1825–28), Platine War (1851–52), Uruguayan War (1864–65) and Paraguayan War (1864–70)), very few military officers achieved the highly distinct rank:

 Luís Alves de Lima e Silva, Duke of Caxias
 Manuel Antônio da Fonseca Costa, Marquis of Gávea
 Francisco Xavier Calmon Cabral da Silva, Baron of Itapagipe
 Manuel Luís Osório, Marquis of Erval
 José Antônio Correia da Câmara, 2nd Viscount of Pelotas
 Francisco José de Sousa Soares de Andréa, Baron of Caçapava
 Gaston d´Orléans, Count of Eu (1864)
 Alexandre Gomes de Argolo Ferrão Filho, Viscount of Itaparica

Marshals of the Republic of Brazil

 Ademar de Queirós 
 Aguinaldo Caiado de Castro 
 Aires Antônio de Morais Âncora 
 Alexandre Gomes de Argolo Ferrão 
 Alexandre Zacharias de Assumpção
 Ângelo Mendes de Morais 
 Antônio Enéias Gustavo Galvão 
 Antônio Henrique Cardim
 Armando Figueira Trompowsky de Almeida (Air Force)
 Bento Manuel Ribeiro 
 Cândido José da Costa 
 Cândido Rondon 
 Carlos Antônio Napion 
 Carlos Frederico Lecor 
 Carlos Machado Bittencourt 
 Casimiro Montenegro Filho (Air Force)
 Cordeiro de Farias 
 Artur da Costa e Silva 

 Deodoro da Fonseca (1884)
 Eduardo Gomes (Air Force)
 Eurico Gaspar Dutra 
 Floriano Peixoto 
 Francisco Arruda Câmara 
 Frederico Augusto de Mesquita 
 Francisco Carlos da Luz 
 Francisco das Chagas Santos 
 Francisco José de Sousa Soares de Andréa 
 Francisco Marcelino de Sousa Aguiar 
 Francisco de Paula Magessi Tavares de Carvalho 
 Guilherme Xavier de Sousa 
 Hastinfilo de Moura 
 Henrique Batista Duffles Teixeira Lott 
 Hermes Ernesto da Fonseca 
 Hermes da Fonseca 
 Humberto de Alencar Castelo Branco (1964)
 João Batista do Rego Barros Cavalcanti de Albuquerque 

 João Carlos Augusto de Oyenhausen-Gravenburg 
 João de Deus Mena Barreto (I) 
 João Frederico Caldwell 
 João de Segadas Viana 
 João de Sousa da Fonseca Costa 
 João Tomás de Cantuária 
 João Vieira de Carvalho 
 Joaquim de Oliveira Álvares 
 Joaquim Xavier Curado 
 José Bernardino Bormann 
 José Egídio Gordilho de Barbuda Filho 
 José de Oliveira Barbosa 
 José Pessoa 
 José Ribeiro de Sousa Fontes
 Juarez Távora
 Júlio Anacleto Falcão da Frota 
 Luís Paulino d'Oliveira Pinto da França 
 Luís Paulino d'Oliveira Pinto da França Garcês  
 Manuel de Almeida Lobo d'Eça 
 Manuel Antônio da Fonseca Costa 
 Manuel Jorge Rodrigues 
 João Baptista Mascarenhas de Morais  
 Odílio Denys 
 Pedro de Alcântara Bellegarde  
 Raimundo José da Cunha Matos 
 Rufino Enéias Gustavo Galvão  
 Salustiano Jerônimo dos Reis 
 Salvador José Maciel 
 Sebastião Barreto Pereira Pinto  
 Tomás Joaquim Pereira Valente 
 Waldemar Levy Cardoso (1966)

References 

Marshals of Brazil
Military ranks of Brazil

pt:Marechal